Los Chamos were a famous Venezuelan boy band formed in Caracas, Venezuela in 1981 to rival Menudo's success. Los Chamos were made up of six members and released their first album "Los Chamos-El Soldadito" sponsored by channel 8 of Venezuelan National TV.

In 1982, they released their second album called "Siempre Te Amare", which spanned the international hit, Canta Chamo.That album went Gold and Platinum in many Latin American countries. 
That hit led them to sing at Mexico's Estadio Azteca, among other big venues in Latin America.

In 1983 they released a third hit album called "Tu Como Yo" produced by famous singer and composer Rudy La'Scala.

That same year "Los Chamos" released a blockbuster movie called "Secuestro En Acapulco-Canta Chamo" alongside famous actresses Yuri-also a singer- and La Chilindrina

Los Chamos went on tour for many years through Mexico, the United States, Puerto Rico, the Dominican Republic, Central America, Panama, Colombia, Ecuador, Peru, etc. After that huge success, four group members alleged poor working conditions and left to pursue other musical endeavors. Four more boys were brought in to form Los Chamos' line up, and another album was released. The sudden, drastic line up change and new album weren't as positively received by the public, and Los Chamos dissolved soon after.  They tried their hand at a fifth release in 1990, with six new members, and after that, Los Chamos officially called it quits.

Nowadays some of the former members relocated and live in the United States, Mexico, Germany and Brazil. On August 29, 2018, Mexican television reporter Ana Maria Canseco announced on her webpage that former Chamo Will Marquez Uzcategui, "Chamo Will", died of pneumonia in his native Venezuela.

Members

1981-1984
Ricardo Messina (sang in the first and second album and was replaced by Chamo Gabriel)
Argenis Brito
Enrique Couselo
Gabriel Fernandez (Replaced Ricardo Messina)
Winston Márquez Uzcategui
Will Márquez Uzcategui
Walter Márquez Uzcategui
Roger Martin (only sang on the first album and was replaced by Argenis)
Raul (who was only in the group for a short amount of time and didn't make any songs with the group)

1984-1987
Adolfo Cubas
Cristóbal "Chris" Roges
Enrico "Henry" Madia
Gabriel Fernández
Enrique Couselo
Juan de León Santana

1987-1991
Álvaro Novoa
Ángel Guinness
Bernard
Carlos Baute
Freddy
Lino Martone
Romulo Ortiz
Jose Acedo (El Powers Inaki)

Discography
1981: Los Chamos [Original Members: Ricardo Messina, Jesus Mercado, Enrique, Winston, William and Walter]
1982: Siempre Te Amare [Original Members]
1983: Tu Como Yo [Original Members]
1984: Chamo Soy [New Members: Adolfo, Chris, Manuel and Juan]
1990: Con un Poco de Amor [New Members: Alvaro, Angel, Bernald, Carlos, Freddy and Lino]

See also
Venezuelan music
Latin American BoyBands.
Latin American Pop groups.

References

External links
 Contains discography and group line-ups (Spanish)

Venezuelan boy bands
Venezuelan musical groups
Musical groups established in 1979
1979 establishments in Venezuela